FindSounds is a website run by the Comparisonics Corporation. It searches an index of over 1,000,000 sounds on the internet, with 100,000 users and 1,000,000 searches each month. The index mainly consists of sound effects and musical instrument samples. Results are in AIFF, AU and WAV formats, in both mono and stereo.

The site offers the FindSounds Palette, a program which also searches the FindSounds index.

The website has been shown on television: TechTV; in newspapers: The New York Times; in magazines: Electronic Musician, Mix, Online, PC World, Popular Science Video Systems, Yahoo! Internet Life; and on countless websites, such as Yahoo's Pick of the Day, and USAToday.com.

The New York Times wrote:

See also
List of search engines

References

External links
FindSounds.com

Sound
Product searching websites